The Durham University History Society is the student history society of Durham University, which aims to represent history students and promote the study of subjects of historical value and interest. It is the oldest, and one of the largest, academic societies at the university.

The society's membership offering includes academic talks, an annual ball, an annual conference, an annual historical journal and various socials.

History 
Established in 1926 by the then Secretary of the Durham Union Society, Edward Leslie Seager of Hatfield College (later the Archdeacon of Dorset), the society has a long history of providing a wide range of social and academic events for its membership.

Until 1943, its leadership operated on a termly basis, before adopting a yearly executive committee cycle. Its members were initially compelled to pay a 'terminal subscription of one shilling' to join the society.

Between 2007 and 2022 the society's logo was based on a 10th-century Viking coin minted in York, before being replaced by the most 'original' logo the society could find in its archives, which dates from at least the 1990s.

The core of the society's offering has long been its academic talks, which were at first the only regular events it held. The society has heard from many prestigious historians including the likes of Gareth Stedman Jones FBA, William Doyle FBA, Hugh McLeod FBA, Robert Bartlett CBE FBA FRSE, Christine Carpenter FRHistS, Colin Jones CBE FRHistS FBA FLSW and Michael Prestwich OBE.

Additionally, the society holds an annual conference. Though it has uncertain beginnings, it has been around for at least a decade, with speeches given by academics from across the country and attended by students from the university and members of the public. In 2015 the theme was 'Cities, Nations and Identity', while in 2020 it was 'Death, Disease and Medicine' which was followed by the 2021 conference 'Revolution, Rebellion & Resistance'.

The society's annual journal is a recent innovation, established in 2007. Though its first years were marked by a blend of academic essays and details of events that had occurred throughout the year, it has since become much more academic-focused. Re-vamped as Critical Historical Studies in 2021, the journal has an ISSN 2754-6225 and aims to promote and recognise original undergraduate historical research from students worldwide.

Finally, between 1996 and 2005 the society put on various plays through its student theatre branch, Pageant Theatre Company, including Journey's End (1996), The Madness of George III (1997), The Crucible (2003) and The Cherry Orchard (2005).

References 

Durham University
Clubs and societies of Durham University
Student societies in the United Kingdom